The Great Žemaičių Kalvarija Festival or The Great Samogitian Calvary Festival is a Roman Catholic festival dedicated to St. Mary. The festival is held annually and takes place every July in the small town of Žemaičių Kalvarija in Samogitia, Lithuania, attracting many pilgrims and tourists.

History
The Samogitian Calvary Way of the Cross was created by bishop Jurgis Tiškevičius in 1637. He replicated all Stations of the Cross precisely just as they appeared in Jerusalem. In 1937 record number of 100,000 pilgrims visited The Great Žemaičių Kalvarija Festival.

Festival

There are 21 Stations of the Cross in this town. Undertaking the stations of the cross is a very important procession for every Catholic, it should be done often or at least once in their lives. The Pope is the main guardian and supporter of this festival.

During the festival there are days dedicated to youth. Many events take place, which may serve spiritual needs of young people. There are special Masses held, dedicated to youth and children.

Pilgrims
The festival attracts many pilgrims from Samogitia and Lithuania, many Catholic churches in Lithuania organize trips for people. Since 2004 there are more tourists and pilgrims coming from the EU States, especially  from Poland, Ireland, Germany and Spain.

Time of events

Great Žemaičių Kalvarija Festival being is held in the first week of July and takes place for around 2 weeks.

2007
In 2007 it was held from 1 to 12 July.

2008
In 2008 it was held from 2 nd to 12 July.

2009
In 2009 Žemaičių Kalvarija Great Festival was held from 1 to 12 July.

 Wednesday, July 1, 2009, Wednesday. Placable Eve
 16.00 St. Mass Panu hill. In the presence of members of the Legion of St. Mary. After St. Mass maldinga gait in Žemaičių Hill.
 19 hrs. Vespers Basilica. Blessing will be given to children for them meldžiamasi. Eucharistinė procession.
 Thursday, July 2, 2009, Thursday. Prayer for the Lithuanian countryside, farmers and temperance Day. Akmenė dean.
 Friday, July 3, 2009. Prayer for the Police, the State leaders and politicians. Mažeikiai dean.
 Saturday July 4, 2009. Prayers for the young families. Tauragė dean. Youth evenings.  19 hrs. St. Mass, followed by - Cross procession in the mountains.
 Sunday, July 5, 2009. Greatest and most important day of Žemaičių Kalvarija Great Festival. The special prayer for the families and communities will be held. Plungė dean.
 Monday, July 6, 2009. Prayer for Christian Lithuanian present and future of the day. Lithuania's millennium. Klaipėda district dean parish.
 Tuesday, July 7, 2009. Prayer for people working, in Malta and other charity orders, the medical staff and patients. Telšiai dean.
 Wednesday July 8, 2009. Prayer for priests and ministrant day. Special prayers for the priests calling for the sanctity. Palangos dean.
 Thursday July 9, 2009. Prayer for the Theological Seminary Day. Šilalės dean.
 Friday July 10, 2009. Prayers for katechetus and educators. Šilutė dean.
 Saturday July 11, 2009. Prayers for the monks. Special day to pray for people working in agriculture. Klaipėda city deanery parishes.
 Sunday July 12, 2009. Žemaičių Calvary Parish Day. Skuodas dean.
 Great mellow worship each day:
 7. 00 hours. J. E. Tent Bishop John Boruta SJ Kęstaičiuose discharge pilgrim to Žemaičių Hill
 7. 30 hours. Liturgical hours of prime Basilica
 8. 00 hours. St. Mass
 10. 00 hours. St. Mass (Votyva).
 After Votyvas' will be held St. M. Litany of Mary, St. dangerous. Sacramento adoration.
 11.30. Pink sacrament next to Holy. Sacrament
 12. 00 hours. St. Mass (amount).
 After the figures - a solemn procession to the main road cross the mountains; at the same time - cross the path inside the Basilica.
 19. 00 hours. St. Mass in the liturgical hours Evening
 On the final day, at 19 hours lenient. St. Mass will not be held in Basilica.

2010
In 2010 Žemaičių Kalvarija Great Festival was held from 1 to 12 July.

2011
In 2010 Žemaičių Kalvarija Great Festival was held from 2 to 12 July. 2011 was announced a Year of God's Mercy. Between 40 and 50 thousand pilgrims participated in Žemaičių Kalvarija Great Festival in 2011. Due to many pilgrims from Latvia in 2011, the special day was dedicated for the Latvian pilgrims.

2012
In 2012 Žemaičių Kalvarija Great Festival was held from 1 to 12 July. In 2012 was celebrated a Year of Blessed Jurgis Matulaitis.

Broadcasting
12 hours. Holy masses were broadcast live:
 Radio:
 On Maria's Radio:
 2nd, 3rd, 4th, 5, 6 July and 9 July 2009.
 Television:
 On Lithuanian national television - 5 July 2009.

References

External links
 Website dedicated to the Great Žemaičių Kalvarija Festival

Christian pilgrimages
Festivals in Lithuania
Annual events in Lithuania
Christian festivals in Europe
July events
Summer events in Lithuania